Zuidema-Idsardi House is a historic home located at Lancaster in Erie County, New York.  It is a locally significant and distinct example of the vernacular interpretation of Italianate style, incorporating elements of Eastlake movement ornamentation. It was built for John H. Zuidema, a local Dutch businessman, circa 1876.

It was listed on the National Register of Historic Places in 1999. It is located in the Broadway Historic District.

References

External links
Zuidema--Idsardi House - U.S. National Register of Historic Places on Waymarking.com

Houses on the National Register of Historic Places in New York (state)
Queen Anne architecture in New York (state)
Italianate architecture in New York (state)
Houses in Erie County, New York
National Register of Historic Places in Erie County, New York
Historic district contributing properties in Erie County, New York